Marty Quinn may refer to:

 Marty Quinn (footballer), Irish footballer and manager
 Marty Quinn (Illinois politician), alderman of the 13th ward in Chicago
 Marty Quinn (Oklahoma politician), American politician in Oklahoma